60 Minutes is the name of a television newsmagazine show previously broadcast in New Zealand on TV3.  The show began in New Zealand in 1989 based on an American programme by the same name.

The broadcaster of 60 Minutes changed twice during the 1990s. It was one of TV3's flagship programmes when TV3 went to air in 1989, then in 1992 TVNZ won the rights to the programme. After being shown on TV1 from 1993 to 2002, TVNZ decided not to renew the rights the show from CBS, and the rights were reacquired by TV3. Following this, there was a fight over the www.60minutes.co.nz domain, which for a short time, redirected to the site on TVNZ's replacement Sunday. Currently, the domain redirects to the www.cbs.com website. From 2013 the programme was broadcast on Prime TV.

During 2015 Charlotte Bellis hosted the show, till December 2015 when the show went through a restructure to a format with a New Zealand presenter introducing international stories from other editions of 60 Minutes around the world.

60 Minutes returned for 2016 on Monday 11 April with the current affairs from around the world presented by Alistair Wilkinson.

Awards
In the inaugural Qantas Television Awards in 2005, the show won 
Best Current Affairs Series
Best Current Affairs Reporter for Amanda Millar
Best Current Affairs Senior Camera for Ross Kenward on a segment called "Green Acres"

At the 2008 Qantas Film and Television Awards, the show won
Best Current Affairs Reporting for a weekly programme or one off current affairs special—Sarah Hall, Paula Penfold, George Murahidy and Catherine Hallinan.
Best Current Affairs Camera—George Murahidy
Best News and Current Affairs Editing—Paul Enticott

Controversy
Some segments broadcast have received negative responses. After an item entitled "Fowl Play" aired on 20 September 2004 about battery farming of hens, the Egg Producers Federation of New Zealand (EPFNZ) complained to the Broadcasting Standards Authority. They claimed it was unbalanced, inaccurate and unfair, but the Authority did not uphold the complaint as the EPFNZ had failed to participate in the item.

In July 2005, an interview with Ashraf Choudhary, the only Muslim Member of Parliament in New Zealand was broadcast. In this Choudhary stated that he would not condemn the practise of stoning to death some homosexuals and people who have extramarital affairs.

A story broadcast in 2005 on the South Pacific received criticism from the Vanuatu Tourism Office General Manager. He said that the story by Rick Williamson was disrespectful to South Pacific cultures, taking footage out of context. In one section chiefs and villagers drinking kava are described as "really hammered" and "plastered on this stuff", while Williamson says when he partook in the kava that it was a "portal to the spirit world".

References

Winners announced for inaugural Qantas Television Awards
BSA decision on "Fowl Play"

"TV rivals bury competitive spirit", National Business Review, 28 February 1992
"Website wrangle turns into current affairs story", New Zealand Herald, 26 August 2002

External links
 

1990 New Zealand television series debuts
1990s New Zealand television series
2000s New Zealand television series
2010s New Zealand television series
60 Minutes
English-language television shows
Prime (New Zealand TV channel) original programming
Three (TV channel) original programming
Television shows funded by NZ on Air
Television series by CBS Studios
New Zealand television series based on American television series